Foy is a name of Irish, English and French origin. Saint Faith is a 3rd century Christian saint and martyr.

People with the name and surname include:

People with the name

Given name
Foy D. Kohler (1908–1990), American diplomat
Foy Vance (born 1974), Northern Irish musician 
Foy E. Wallace (1896–1979), American preacher

Surname
Anne Foy (born 1986), British TV presenter
Ashley Foy (born 1990), American ice dancer
brian d foy, American computer programmer and author
Bryan Foy (1896–1977), American film director and producer who was earlier one of the "Seven Little Foys"
Charles H. Foy (1809–1866), American Medal of Honor recipient
Charley Foy (1898–1984), American actor
Chris Foy (actor) (born 1983), Australian actor
Chris Foy (referee) (born 1962), English football referee
Ciarán Foy, Irish film director
Claire Foy (born 1984), English actress
Darron Foy (born 1971), English cricketer
Des Foy (born 1963), Irish rugby player
Douglas I. Foy (born c. 1947), American environmentalist
E. W. Foy (1937–2014), American basketball coach
Eddie Foy, stage name of Edwin Fitzgerald (1856–1928), American actor, comedian, dancer and vaudevillian
 Eddie Foy Jr. (1905–1983), American character actor who was earlier one of the "Seven Little Foys"
 Eddie Foy III (1935–2018), American actor and film director
Emma Foy (born 1989), New Zealand para-cyclist
Frances Foy (1890–1963), American artist
Fred Foy (1921–2010), American actor and voice performer
Frederick Foy (1915–1995), English cricketer
Gray Foy (1922–2012), American artist
Humphrey Foy (1886–1956), American football player
James Joseph Foy (1847–1916), Canadian lawyer 
Joe Foy (1943–1989), American baseball player
John Foy (1882–1960), American track and field athlete
Keith Foy (born 1981), Irish footballer
Kylie Foy (born 1971), New Zealand field hockey player
Lyla Foy (aka Wall), English singer/songwriter 
Laura Foy (born 1976), American television host
Lydia Foy, Irish trans woman activist
Mackenzie Foy (born 2000), American actress and model
Magda Foy (1905–2000), "The Solax Kid", American child actor
Mark Foy (businessman) (1865–1950), Australian retailer
Mark Foy (footballer) (born 1973), New Zealand football player
Mary Foy (disambiguation), several people
Mathilda Foy (1813–1869), Swedish philanthropist 
Matt Foy (born 1983), Canadian ice hockey player
Matthew Foy (born 1998), English footballer
Maximilien Sébastien Foy (1775–1825), French military leader, statesman and writer
Murray Foy (1935–1998), Australian actor and director
Nathan Foy (born 1981), Welsh-born English blind cricketer
Nathaniel Foy (died 1707), Irish religious figure
Pat Foy (born 1965), Australian rules footballer
Peter Foy (1925–2005), English stage-flight-effects specialist
Philip Foy (1891–1957), Argentine first-class cricketer
Robbie Foy (born 1985), Scottish footballer
Robert W. Foy (1916–1950), American fighter pilot triple-ace during World War II
Shirley Bunnie Foy (1936–2016), American musician
Thomas P. Foy (1951–2004), American politician
Tim Foy, British territorial governor
Tom Foy (1879–1917), English music hall performer
Tommy Foy (1910–1985), Irish football player
Vincent Foy (born 1915), Canadian Roman Catholic cleric and theologian
Walter Frank Foy (1908–1993), Canadian politician

Fictional characters 
Betty Foy, a fictional character in William Wordsworth's The Idiot Boy

See also
Foy (disambiguation)
Sainte-Foy (disambiguation)